Jozef Liščák (18 January 1947 – 13 October 2022) was Minister of Justice of Slovakia in third government of Vladimír Mečiar.

References

1947 births
2022 deaths
People from Čadca District
Justice ministers of Slovakia